Flatkvål /fla:kol/ is a village in the Eksingedalen valley in Vaksdal municipality, Vestland county, Norway. Flatkvål is the site of Eksingedal Church.

History
Flatkvål was administratively a part of Voss municipality starting in 1838. On 1 January 1885 the northeastern half of the Eksingedalen valley was separated from Voss to form the new municipality of Evanger (this included Flatkvål). On 1 January 1964, all of the Bergsdalen and Eksingedalen valleys with 251 inhabitants combined were merged with most of Bruvik municipality and a part of Modalen municipality to create the new municipality Vaksdal.  Flatkvål has been part of Vaksdal since that time.

Media gallery

References

Villages in Vestland
Vaksdal